North Central Historic District is a national historic district in Baltimore, Maryland, United States. It is an area of approximately 25 city blocks directly north of downtown Baltimore and includes 630 buildings. The roughly triangular-shaped, mixed-use district comprises late-19th century row housing, commercial storefronts from the turn of the 20th century through the 1950s, large industrial buildings, several older theatres, a church, and two school buildings.  A broad variety of row house sizes and types reflects the diversity of the neighborhood's residents, ranging from the large and architecturally elaborate dwellings of the upper class to the small alley houses of working-class African Americans.

It was added to the National Register of Historic Places in 2002.

References

External links
, including photo from 2002, at Maryland Historical Trust
Boundary Map of the North Central Historic District, Baltimore City, at Maryland Historical Trust

African-American history in Baltimore
Historic districts on the National Register of Historic Places in Baltimore
Greek Revival architecture in Maryland
Neoclassical architecture in Maryland
Working-class culture in Baltimore